The Leucomini are a tribe of tussock moths of the family Erebidae.

Description
Moths of this tribe typically have a red color on the underside of the head and thorax and on the legs and have asymmetric genitalia.

Genera
The tribe includes the following genera.  This list may be incomplete.
Dendrophleps
Leucoma
Perina

References

Lymantriinae
Moth tribes